Oxford House is a building on the University of North Dakota campus in Grand Forks, North Dakota, United States that was listed on the National Register of Historic Places in 1973.

When it was built in 1902, it was considered one of the most fashionable houses in the Northwest.

It was designed by architect Joseph Bell DeRemer in Colonial Revival style.

References

Houses on the National Register of Historic Places in North Dakota
Houses in Grand Forks, North Dakota
Houses completed in 1902
Colonial Revival architecture in North Dakota
Joseph Bell DeRemer buildings
National Register of Historic Places in Grand Forks, North Dakota
1902 establishments in North Dakota